Alma-0 is a multi-paradigm computer programming language. This language is an augmented version of the imperative Modula-2 language with logic-programming features and convenient backtracking ability. It is small, strongly typed, and combines constraint programming, a limited number of features inspired by logic programming and supports imperative paradigms. The language advocates declarative programming. The designers claim that search-oriented solutions built with it are substantially simpler than their counterparts written in purely imperative or logic programming style. Alma-0 provides natural, high-level constructs for building search trees.

Overview
Since the designers of Alma-0 wanted to create a distinct and substantially simpler proposal than prior attempts to integrate declarative programming constructs (such as automatic backtracking) into imperative programming, the design of Alma-0 was guided by four principles:
 The logic-based extension should be downward compatible with the underlying imperative programming language
 The logic-based extension should be upward compatible with a future extension that will support constraint programming
 The constructs that will implement the extension should support and encourage declarative programming
 The extension should be kept small: nine new features have been proposed and implemented

Alma-0 can be viewed not only as a specific and concrete programming language proposal, but also as an example of a generic method for extending any imperative programming language with features that support declarative programming.

The feasibility of the Alma-0 approach has been demonstrated through a full implementation of the language (including a description of its semantics) for a subset of Modula-2.

Features
The implemented features in Alma-0 include:
Use of boolean expressions as statements and vice versa
A dual for the FOR statement that introduces non-determinism in the form of choice points and backtracking
A FORALL statement that introduces a controlled form of iteration over the backtracking
Unification which, although limited to the use of equality as assignment, yields a new parameter-passing mechanism.

Imperative and logic programming modes
The Alma-0 designers claim that the assignment, which is usually shunned in pure declarative and logic programming, is actually needed in a number of natural situations, including for counting and recording purposes. They also affirm that the means of expression of such "natural" uses of assignment within the logic programming paradigm are unnatural.

References 

 Jacob Brunekreef (1998). "Annotated Algebraic Specification of the Syntax and Semantics of the Programming Language Alma-0".
 Krzysztof R. Apt, Jacob Brunekreef, Vincent Partington, Andrea Schaerf (1998). "Alma-0: An Imperative Language that Supports Declarative Programming".
 Krzysztof R. Apt, Andrea Schaerf (1998). "Programming in Alma-0, or Imperative and Declarative Programming Reconciled".
 Krzysztof R. Apt, Andrea Schaerf (1998). "Integrating Constraints into an Imperative Programming Language".
 Krzysztof R. Apt, Andrea Schaerf (1999). "The Alma Project, or How First-Order Logic Can Help Us in Imperative Programming".

Modula programming language family
Systems programming languages
Procedural programming languages
Logic programming languages
Multi-paradigm programming languages
Programming languages created in the 20th century
Constraint programming languages